Manoba triparallellinea is a moth in the family Nolidae. It was described by van Eecke in 1920. It is found on Java.

References

Natural History Museum Lepidoptera generic names catalog

Moths described in 1920
Nolinae